Metopocampta is a genus of picture-winged flies in the family Ulidiidae.

Species
 M. planiceps

References

Ulidiidae